In enzymology, a 6-hydroxymellein O-methyltransferase is an enzyme that catalyzes the chemical reaction

S-adenosyl-L-methionine + 6-hydroxymellein  S-adenosyl-L-homocysteine + 6-methoxymellein

Thus, the two substrates of this enzyme are S-adenosyl methionine and 6-hydroxymellein, whereas its two products are S-adenosylhomocysteine and 6-methoxymellein.

This enzyme belongs to the family of transferases, specifically those transferring one-carbon group methyltransferases.  The systematic name of this enzyme class is S-adenosyl-L-methionine:6-hydroxymellein 6-O-methyltransferase. This enzyme is also called 6-hydroxymellein methyltransferase.

References

 

EC 2.1.1
Enzymes of unknown structure